Rabbi Isaac Antebi Sacca ( (born 1964) is the Sephardi Chief Rabbi of Buenos Aires, as well as the founder and president of Menora, an organization for Jewish youth.

Biography

Early life and education
Rabbi Sacca was born in Buenos Aires into a Jewish family from Aleppo and Eastern Europe. He studied at Yesod Hadat, a community in Buenos Aires that keeps Aleppo's Jewish traditions. There, he became a distinguished student of Chacham Yitzhak Chehebar, the Chief Rabbi of Argentina.

From 1981 to 1984, Rabbi Isaac Sacca studied at Porat Yosef Yeshiva, located in the Old City of Jerusalem. From 1985 to 1989, he studied at Yechave Daat Beit Midrash -within the first group of students it has ever had- directed by Rabbi Ovadia Yosef, who afterwards granted him rabbinical ordination. Rabbi Sacca is considered one of Rabbi Ovadia Yosef's closest students.

Rabbinical career
From 1989 to 1997, he led the youth department at Yesod Hadat and taught at Beth David Yeshiva within the same community.

In 1996, he founded Menora Organization, with the aim of strengthening the Jewish identity and spreading religious values among the Argentinian Jewish youth.

Since 1997, Rabbi Sacca has been the Sephardi Chief Rabbi in Buenos Aires.

Interfaith work
He often meets and discusses different topics with multiple religious and political leaders. Among them is Pope Francis, with whom he has met many times since the period the Pope was the Archbishop of Buenos Aires.

Published works
Books compiled by Rabbi Isaac Sacca

Otzarot Chachme Aram Tzova Al HaRambam: it contains interpretations and commentaries on the Rambam's Mishneh Torah- Sefer haMada- written by the greatest sages from Aleppo in all generations. 
(Published by Machon Aram Tzova-Yerushalaim, 1989)

Michtabe Halacha Yitzhak Yeranen: it includes halachic writings and answers by Rabbi Yitzhak Chehebar, Chief Rabbi of the Jews from Aleppo in Buenos Aires. 
(Published by the Sephardi Community in Argentina, Yesod Hadat- 1992)

Books translated by Rab Isaac Sacca

Chazon Ovadia: Pesach's Laws and Haggadah, written by Rabbi Ovadia Yosef.
(Published by Midrash Sepharadi-1989)

Torat Hamoadim: Halachic resolutions on the Jewish festivities written by Rabbi David Yosef.
(Published by Yechave Daat Beit Midrash-1990)

References

External links
  Rabbi Isaac Sacca's official website (English)

Syrian rabbis
Chief rabbis
Argentine rabbis
Sephardi rabbis
Jews and Judaism in Argentina
1964 births
Living people